Foyran ( possibly pertaining to a well, Tobar), is a historic monument, religious parish, and townland, civil parish in County Westmeath, Ireland.

Foyran is one of 8 civil parishes in the barony of Fore in the Province of Leinster.

Foyran civil parish comprises the small village of Finnea and 20 townlands: Ballynascarry, Carn, Clareisland or Derrymacegan, Cornacreevy, Derrymacegan or Clareisland, Finnea, Foyran, Lisnugent, Money, Moneybeg, Mullaghmeen, Rathshane, Togher, Tonyowen Lower, Tonyowen Upper, Tullyhill, Tullystown and Williamstown.

The neighbouring civil parishes are: Ballymachugh, Drumlumman and Kilbride (all County Cavan) to the north, Killeagh (County Meath) to the east, Lickbla, Rathgarve and St. Feighin's to the south and Abbeylara (County Longford) to the west.

References

External links
Foyran civil parish at the IreAtlas Townland Data Base
Foyran civil parish at townlands.ie
Foyran civil parish at The Placename Database of Ireland

Civil parishes of County Westmeath